Richard Master (1746-1800) was the member of Parliament for the constituency of Cirencester from 1785 to 1792.

He served as Governor of Tobago from 1799 until his death the following year.

References 

1746 births
1800 deaths
Members of Parliament for Cirencester
British MPs 1784–1790
British MPs 1790–1796